This list is of Major Sites Protected for their Historical and Cultural Value at the National Level in the Province of Shanxi, People's Republic of China.

 

 

 
 
 
 

 
 

  

 

 

 

 

 

 

|}

As well as sites protected at the national level there are 696 sites in Shanxi that are protected at the provincial level (see 山西省文物保护单位).

See also

 Principles for the Conservation of Heritage Sites in China

References

Major National Historical and Cultural Sites in Shanxi
Shanxi